The Ric Charlesworth Classic is an Australian field hockey tournament.

The competition serves as a selection trial for Western Australia's representative team in the Sultana Bran Hockey One, the Perth Thundersticks.

The Suns and Breakers are the current champions in the men's and women's competitions, respectively.

History
The Ric Charlesworth Classic was founded on 22 September 2019 by Hockey WA. The tournament is named after Australian hockey legend, Dr. Richard Charlesworth.

Due to the ongoing effects of the COVID–19 Pandemic in 2020, Hockey Australia was forced to cancel a number of national tournaments. With no high quality competition being contested, Hockey WA formulated a new competition to showcase the best players in the state, as well as members of Hockey Australia's High Performance Program.

Teams
Four teams were established for the tournament:

 Breakers
 Highlanders
 Outbacks
 Suns

Summaries

Men's tournament

Women's tournament

References

External links
Official website

Field hockey leagues in Australia
Professional sports leagues in Australia
2020 establishments in Australia
Sports leagues established in 2020
Sports competitions in Perth, Western Australia